The Girls is a 1968 Swedish drama film directed by Mai Zetterling, starring Bibi Andersson, Harriet Andersson and Gunnel Lindblom. It is a feminist reinvention of the ancient Greek play Lysistrata by Aristophanes, and revolves around a theatre group who set up the play.

In 1996 a documentary on the making of the film, Lines From the Heart, was made by director Christina Olofson.

Plot
Liz, Marianne, and Gunilla are three actresses who have been hired to perform in a touring production of Lysistrata. Each woman faces challenges leaving their homes in order to tour. Marianne has left her married boyfriend and finds it difficult to leave her toddler in the hands of babysitters as she goes on tour. Liz's husband is having an affair and wants her to leave while Gunilla, a mother of four young children, is urged not to leave by her husband who wants her to stay at home to help with the children.

Along the tour they are met with polite indifference as audience members either fail to grasp the meaning of the play or are bored by it. After one performance Liz asks members of the audience to stay behind to discuss the meaning of the play but when she tries to speak to them of the importance of women they do not react and a male member of the company acts as if it is just a continuation of the play and ushers her offstage. Liz's stunt attracts attention from the press but as Liz is not able to identify any one incident that led to her outburst they are dismissive of it. Later all three of the leads go out to dinner and talk over the problem of no one relating to the play wondering if perhaps it would be better if they held a woman only show. At dinner they are bothered by several men and when they turn down the men's advances the men become hostile and only leave after Marianne threatens them.

On the road, a friend of Liz's husband urges her to come home on behalf of her husband, saying he needs a wife to properly support him and his work. Liz argues that she is tired of putting her husband first but her husband's friend argues that her husband's work is more important than hers. She stays on till the end of the play.

The tour finishes and the women return home feeling as though they while no one is willing to change they have at least made people more aware of the misery of their lives. At a party celebrating the end of the play Liz tells the company that she wants to get a divorce.

Cast
 Bibi Andersson as Liz
 Harriet Andersson as Marianne
 Gunnel Lindblom as Gunilla
 Gunnar Björnstrand as Hugo
 Erland Josephson as Carl
 Frank Sundström as the doctor
 Åke Lindström as Bengt
 Stig Engström as Thommy
 Ulf Palme as director

Release and reception
The film premiered in Sweden on 16 September 1968 through Sandrew Film & Teater. In 2012, the film was voted one of the 25 best Swedish films of all time.

References

External links
 
 

1968 drama films
1968 films
1960s feminist films
1960s female buddy films
Films directed by Mai Zetterling
Swedish drama films
1960s Swedish-language films
Films based on works by Aristophanes
Works based on Lysistrata
1960s Swedish films